Formstack is a workplace productivity platform that lets organizations create digital workflows with no-code forms, documents, and signatures. Founded in 2006, the company was created by Ade Olonoh and serves over 25,000 organizations worldwide.

History 
Formstack was founded by Ade Olonoh on February 28, 2006. In November 2009, Formstack (then called FormSpring) launched formspring.me, a social question and answer site where users could ask questions, give answers, and learn more about their friends. Because of the success of the site, formspring.me was spun out as a separate company in January 2010 with a different team and different resources. To allow both companies to continue their growth, FormSpring.com became Formstack.com to avoid any confusion with formspring.me.

Originally created as an online form builder, Formstack has expanded its offerings to include data and workflow management for various industries, including healthcare, education, insurance, nonprofit, government, and finance. The company is headquartered in Indianapolis, IN with another office located in Colorado Springs, CO. Over half of Formstack's workforce works remotely in regions across the United States and around the world.

Software and Services 
Formstack enables organizations to create digital workflows without any programming or software skills required. Formstack users can collect data with online forms, generate digital documents, and gather electronic signatures.

The platform integrates with over 100 web applications, including apps for CRM management, email marketing, payment processing, and document management. Other product offerings include conversion rate optimization tools for marketers, workflow automation for Salesforce, and solutions for HIPAA compliance.

References

External links 
Official website

:pt:Formspring

Companies based in Indianapolis
Internet properties established in 2006